Probable G-protein coupled receptor 19 is a protein that in humans is encoded by the GPR19 gene. GPR19 has been proposed as the receptor for the peptide hormone adropin.

References

Further reading

G protein-coupled receptors